The Huanghua–Shijiazhuang Expressway, commonly referred to as the Huangshi Expressway, is a  that connects the cities of Huanghua and Shijiazhuang. The expressway is entirely in the province of Hebei and opened on 10 December 2000. It is the only auxiliary spur of the G18 Rongcheng–Wuhai Expressway.

References

Chinese national-level expressways
Expressways in Hebei